The 1966 Roller Hockey World Cup was the seventeenth roller hockey world cup, organized by the Fédération Internationale de Roller Sports. It was contested by 10 national teams (6 from Europe, 3 from South America and 1 from North America, for the first time ever). All the games were played in the city of São Paulo, in Brazil, the chosen city to host the World Cup.

Results

Standings

See also
 FIRS Roller Hockey World Cup

External links
 1966 World Cup in rink-hockey.net historical database

Roller Hockey World Cup
International roller hockey competitions hosted by Brazil
1966 in roller hockey
1966 in Brazilian sport